Matthew Lorenzo Austin (born 31 January 1985 in Colchester, Essex) is a former first-class cricketer. 
He studied at Oundle School and Emmanuel College, Cambridge, playing first-class cricket for Cambridge University Cricket Club. He played two first-class matches; the 2006 University Match at The Parks and the 2007 match at Fenner's.

References

External links 
 www.cucc.net

1985 births
Living people
People from Colchester
People educated at Oundle School
Alumni of Emmanuel College, Cambridge
English cricketers
Cambridge University cricketers